Christopher Comstock (October 7, 1635 – December 8, 1702) was an early settler of Norwalk, Connecticut. He was a deputy of the General Assembly of the Colony of Connecticut from Norwalk in the sessions of October 1686, May 1689, and May 1690.

Comstock emigrated from England and originally settled in Fairfield in 1654.

On May 29, 1654, Comstock wrote an affidavit about his visiting with a woman named Knapp who was charged with witchcraft and who was later executed. On January 27, 1661, Comstock bought land from Thomas Betts. On September 19, 1692, he was part of the grand jury investigating witchcraft.

Comstock was nominated to be named a Freeman on October 10, 1667.

On October 14, 1686, he was a deputy to the General Court of the Colony of Connecticut. On January 16, 1694, he was appointed to a committee to obtain a minister for Norwalk.

Notable descendants 
 Anthony Comstock, 5th great-grandson
 Henry Comstock, 6th great-grandson

References 

1635 births
1702 deaths
Deputies of the Connecticut General Assembly (1662–1698)
English emigrants
People from Devon
Politicians from Norwalk, Connecticut
Saloonkeepers
Settlers of Connecticut